Lucknow Super Giants is a franchise cricket team based in Lucknow, Uttar Pradesh. The 2023 season will be the 2nd season for the Indian Premier League franchise Lucknow Super Giants (LSG). They are one among the ten teams that are going to compete in the 2023 Indian Premier League.

Administration and support staff

Current squad
 Players with international caps are listed in bold.

References

2023 Indian Premier League